Alfieri is an Italian surname. It may also refer to:

 Alfieri clan, Neapolitan Camorra clan operating on the north-east of Naples
 Magliano Alfieri, commune in the Italian region Piedmont
 Maserati Alfieri, 2+2 grand tourer automobile
 San Martino Alfieri, municipality in the Province of Asti in the Italian region Piedmont
 Teatro Alfieri, Castelnuovo di Garfagnana, 19th-century theatre and opera house in Tuscany, Italy
 Teatro Alfieri, Florence, theatre and opera house in 18th and 19th century Florence